The Altrincham by-election was a Parliamentary by-election held on 28 May 1913. The constituency returned one Member of Parliament (MP) to the House of Commons of the United Kingdom, elected by the first past the post voting system.

Vacancy
The vacancy occurred following the resignation of John Kebty-Fletcher, the sitting Unionist Member of Parliament for Altrincham.

Electoral history
Kebty-Fletcher had won the seat from the Liberal Party at the previous general election in December 1910 with a slim majority of 119 votes.

Candidates
On 2 May, the candidates for the by-election were selected. The Altrincham Unionist Association chose George Hamilton of Knutsford, while the Liberals nominated Lawrence Kay-Shuttleworth, eldest son of Lord Shuttleworth, Lord-Lieutenant of Lancashire.

Campaign
The writ for the by-election was moved on 8 May, and the date for the election was set as 28 May. The delay was due to allow for the week-long Whitsun holiday enjoyed by Manchester workers.

The Liberals had formed a minority government with the support of Irish Nationalists. As the price of Nationalist support the government was attempting to introduce Home Rule for Ireland.

One of the main issues in the contest was Home Rule The Irish Nationalist leaders John Redmond and T P O'Connor urged Irish voters to support Kay-Shuttleworth. Hamilton spoke out in support of the Ulster Unionists who were threatening armed insurrection to resist devolution. This led to the Manchester Guardian launching an attack on the Conservative candidate as a "revolutionist". The apparent lack of support for Hamilton by Kebty-Fletcher, and his treatment by the local Unionist Party caused some controversy, although he eventually issued a letter discounting the story.

The government majority had been reduced from 126 to 106 following the loss of a string of by-elections since December 1910. The Liberals hoped to reverse this trend by regaining the Altrincham seat.

The Liberal Government was planning on passing a Plural Voting Bill that sought to prevent electors who appeared on the electoral register twice from voting twice. Liberal and Unionist HQs were in agreement over 25 seats that were won by Unionists in December 1910 because of plural voting, and this was one of those constituencies.

The Altrincham Trades Council called on workers to vote against Hamilton, who as a major employer refused to pay union rates.

Result
The Unionists easily held the seat with a greatly increased majority. This was however partly explained by an increase in the electorate of 1,939 voters since 1910. Nevertheless, the result was deeply disappointing for the government. In contrast, Unionists were delighted, and Lord Londonderry, President of the Ulster Unionist Council sent a message of congratulation to Hamilton.

Aftermath
Hamilton held the seat for ten years, losing to a Liberal candidate at the 1923 general election.

References

1913 elections in the United Kingdom
1913 in England
20th century in Cheshire
Altrincham
Elections in Trafford
By-elections to the Parliament of the United Kingdom in Greater Manchester constituencies
By-elections to the Parliament of the United Kingdom in Cheshire constituencies
May 1913 events